Yuxarı Veysəlli is a village in the Fuzuli District of Azerbaijan. It was under the occupation of the Armenian forces of the self-proclaimed Republic of Artsakh since the First Nagorno-Karabakh war, until its recapture by the Azerbaijan Army on November 7 2020, during the 2020 Nagorno-Karabakh war.

References

External links 

Populated places in Fuzuli District